The Rock Island Depot and Freight House is a two-story railroad station and adjacent one-story freight house from the turn of the 20th century. It was constructed in 1899 directly besides the Illinois River in the American city of Peoria, Illinois. The depot and freight house are Peoria's last remaining historic reminders of the importance of railroading in the city's past. The depot was built by the Chicago, Rock Island and Pacific Railroad as the terminus of a major branch line that delivered significant goods and passengers to Peoria.  The 1900 opening of the depot was attended by "throngs of populous;" at its height before the depression of the 1880s, Peoria was a transportation hub. The station's clock tower was removed in 1939. The buildings were listed on the U.S. National Register of Historic Places in 1978. The last Rock Island train out of the station was the Peoria Rocket in 1978, of the company's Rock Island Rockets series.

After the end of train service, the building became known as River Station, and has been a restaurant, and afterwards a set of restaurants and bars. Currently the building is occupied by Martinis On Water Street, and The Blue Duck Barbecue Tavern.  It is adjacent to the Peoria Riverfront Museum.

See also
Prairie Marksman
Rock Island Rockets
Peoria Union Station — demolished station to the southwest

Notes

External links
 Martinis On Water Street
 The Blue Duck Barbecue Tavern

Buildings and structures in Peoria, Illinois
Former railway stations in Illinois
Railway stations on the National Register of Historic Places in Illinois
National Register of Historic Places in Peoria County, Illinois
Peoria
Railway freight houses on the National Register of Historic Places
Railway stations in the United States opened in 1900
Railway buildings and structures on the National Register of Historic Places in Illinois
Transportation buildings and structures in Peoria County, Illinois